is a Japanese singer and lyricist from Tokyo who was previously signed to Horipro and is currently signed to Lantis. Since 2014, she has performed under the stage name True (stylized as TRUE). She has performed theme songs for Violet Evergarden, Buddy Complex, Gargantia on the Verdurous Planet, Maria the Virgin Witch, and Sound! Euphonium, among others. Karasawa made her debut in 2000 with the release of the song "Anytime, Anywhere".

Discography

Single

References

External links 
 Lantis profile 
 Official blog  
 

1983 births
Anime musicians
Japanese women musicians
Japanese musicians
Lantis (company) artists
Living people
Musicians from Tokyo
21st-century Japanese women musicians